Lost Ark may refer to:
The Ark of the Covenant, a religious artifact considered lost
Noah's Ark, as described in some searches for Noah's Ark
Lost Ark (video game), 2019 video game

See also
Raiders of the Lost Ark (disambiguation)